Fokus (Focus) is an Indonesian flagship television news program that broadcasts on Indosiar. The news program airs every day starting at 06.00, 12.00, 17.30 and 00.30WiB. Fokus contains actual and current news material from Indonesia and worldwide.

The news intake that is packaged in this event is present to meet the needs of the audience for news that is not only informative, but also upholds journalistic ethics. The audience presented several events in five principles, namely: influencing the lives of many people (significance), events that just happened (recentness), events that are close to the community (proximity), concerning famous people and things (prominence), and events that involve ordinary people in extraordinary situations (human interest), as well as other varieties by upholding independence, not biased, and cover both sides.

Especially for international news, the material presented is information that has closeness to the Indonesian people. Meanwhile, the events that took place in the regions of West Asia and Southeast Asia as well as some areas adjacent to Indonesia will be the main choice of news from abroad. The program will be presented to the audience with five different packages. The news material displayed includes developments in political, economic, social news and various other interesting events.

Logos

Time Slots History

Fokus Pagi 
 07:00-07:30 WIB (2 February 1998 – 30 March 1998)
 06:00-06:30 WIB (3 February 1998 – 4 April 1998, 6 April 1998 – 6 December 2003, 3 October-13 November 2009, 1 February-24 April 2010)
 05:00-05:30 WIB (8 December 2003 – 4 June 2005)
 06:00-07:00 WIB (6 June 2005 – 30 September 2009, 26 April 2010 – 31 May 2013)
 06:00-07:30 WIB (1 October 2009 – 30 January 2010)
 05:30-07:00 WIB (1 June 2013 – 31 December 2013)
 05:00-06:30 WIB (1 January 2014 – 29 March 2015)
 04:30-06:00 WIB (30 March 2015 – present)

Fokus Siang
 11:30-12:00 WIB (11 November 1996 – 30 January 1998)
 12:30-13:00 WIB (15 December 2003 – 30 December 2007)
 12:00-12:30 WIB (1 January 2008 – 25 April 2010)
 11:00-11:30 WIB (17 May 2018 – 1 January 2023)
 10:30-11:00 WIB (2 January 2023 – Now)

Fokus Sore 
 16:00-16:30 WIB (2–28 February 1998)
 16:30-17:00 WIB (2 March 1998 – 13 December 2003, 1 January-30 June 2018)
 15:00-15:30 WIB (23 April-20 November 2010, 17 January 2011-17 November 2012)
 15:00-16:00 WIB (22 November 2010 – 15 January 2011)
 15:30-16:30 WIB (19 November 2012 – 31 December 2017)

Fokus Malam
 00:30-01:00 WIB (3 February 2009 – 17 November 2012)
 01:00-01:30 WIB (19 November 2012 – 31 December 2016)
 02:00-02:30 WIB (3 January-31 December 2017)
 02:30-03:00 WIB (2 January-29 December 2018)
 03:00-03:30 WIB (1 January 2019 – 12 February 2022)
 03:30-04:00 WIB (13 February 2022 – present)

News Anchor

See also 

 Kompas
 Liputan 6

References

External links 
Indosiar website

Indonesian television news shows
Indonesian-language television shows
1990s Indonesian television series
2000s Indonesian television series
2010s Indonesian television series
1996 Indonesian television series debuts
Indosiar original programming